Tally Ho! is a studio album by Luke Vibert, released in 1998. It is the third album under his alias Wagon Christ.

Critical reception
Jason Kaufman of AllMusic gave the album 4.5 stars out of 5, commenting that "The songs here branch out in various directions, whether it's R&B beats giving way to classical piano flourishes or swelling basslines embracing gurgling samples, robotic blips, and kabuki drums." Ryan Schreiber of Pitchfork gave the album a 7.9 out of 10, saying, "It's got groove, love, and a sense of humor".

Track listing

References

External links
 

1998 albums
Luke Vibert albums
Astralwerks albums